Frémy's salt is a chemical compound with the formula (K4[ON(SO3)2]2), sometimes written as (K2[NO(SO3)2]). It a bright yellowish-brown solid, but its aqueous solutions are bright violet. The related sodium salt, disodium nitrosodisulfonate (NDS, Na2ON(SO3)2, CAS 29554-37-8) is also referred to as Frémy's salt.

Regardless of the cations, the salts are distinctive because aqueous solutions contain the radical [ON(SO3)2]2−.

Applications 
Frémy's salt, being a long-lived free radical, is used as a standard in electron paramagnetic resonance (EPR) spectroscopy, e.g. for quantitation of radicals.  Its intense EPR spectrum is dominated by three lines of equal intensity with a spacing of about 13 G (1.3 mT).

The inorganic aminoxyl group is a persistent radical, akin to TEMPO.

It has been used in some oxidation reactions, such as for oxidation of some anilines and phenols allowing  polymerization and cross-linking of peptides and peptide-based hydrogels.

It can also be used as a model for peroxyl radicals in studies that examine the antioxidant mechanism of action in a wide range of natural products.

Preparation 
Frémy's salt is prepared from hydroxylaminedisulfonic acid. Oxidation of the conjugate base gives the purple dianion:

HON(SO3H)2 → [HON(SO3)2]2− + 2 H+
2 [HON(SO3)2]2− + PbO2 → 2 [ON(SO3)2]2− + PbO + H2O

The synthesis can be performed by combining nitrite and bisulfite to give the hydroxylaminedisulfonate. Oxidation is typically conducted at low-temperature, either chemically or by electrolysis.

Other reactions:

 HNO2 + 2  →  + H2O
 3  +  + H+  →  3  + MnO2 + 2 H2O
 2  + 4 K+ → K4[ON(SO3)2]2

History
Frémy's salt was discovered in 1845 by Edmond Frémy (1814–1894).  Its use in organic synthesis was popularized by Hans Teuber, such that an oxidation using this salt is called the Teuber reaction.

References

Further reading 
 

Free radicals
Oxidizing agents
Sodium compounds
Potassium compounds
Nitrogen–oxygen compounds
Reagents for organic chemistry